Gareth John Marriott (born 14 July 1970 in Mansfield) is a British slalom canoeist who competed at the international level from 1986 to 1997.

Competing in two Summer Olympics, he won a silver medal in the C1 event at Barcelona in 1992 and finished 4th in the C1 event at Atlanta in 1996

Marriott also won three medals at the ICF Canoe Slalom World Championships with a silver (C1 team: 1993) and two bronzes (C1: 1997, C1 team: 1991).

He won the overall World Cup title three times in the C1 class (1991, 1994 and 1995).

World Cup individual podiums

References

1970 births
English male canoeists
Canoeists at the 1992 Summer Olympics
Canoeists at the 1996 Summer Olympics
Living people
Olympic canoeists of Great Britain
Olympic silver medallists for Great Britain
Olympic medalists in canoeing
Sportspeople from Mansfield
British male canoeists
Medalists at the 1992 Summer Olympics
Medalists at the ICF Canoe Slalom World Championships